Ben Lawers is the highest mountain in the Breadalbane region of the Scottish Highlands. It lies north of Loch Tay and is the highest peak of the 'Ben Lawers group', a ridge that includes six other Munros: Beinn Ghlas, Meall Garbh, Meall Corranaich, An Stùc, Meall Greigh and Meall a' Choire Leith. It is also the highest peak in Perthshire, and the tenth highest Munro in Scotland. Ben Lawers was long thought to be over 4000 feet in height; accurate measurement in the 1870s showed it to be .

Ben Lawers lies on the watershed between the rivers Tay and Lyon. Since the 1950s, water has been captured from the numerous burns on the south face of Ben Lawers and Meall nan Tarmachan as part of the Breadalbane Hydro-Electric Scheme. The water is diverted to the Lochan na Lairige, from where it is piped to drive hydro-electric turbines at Finlarig on the banks of Loch Tay. The level of the Lochan na Lairige was raised by the construction of the 344-metre-long Lawers Dam, a buttress-type dam that is 42 m high. Due to the height of this reservoir the static head of water is 415 m, the highest available on any hydro-electric scheme in Scotland.

Due to its high altitude and underlying geology Ben Lawers is home to an exceptionally rich selection of arctic-alpine plant species and habitats, and has been designated as a National Nature Reserve (NNR) since 1964.

History
There is much evidence of former settlements and other human activity on the southern slopes of Ben Lawers above Loch Tay. The fertile limestone and schist soils on these southern slopes have been farmed since very early times and there are many Bronze Age remains. The discovery of many boulders with cup and ring marks led Derek Alexander, an archaeologist for the National Trust for Scotland, to note that the Ben Lawers was likely to have been "a very significant landscape in prehistory."

Overgrown tracks climb up the mountain from the valley to the peat beds and sheilings on the hillside, and there are ruins of cottages each surrounded by a small group of trees. These, along with the remains of ridged pastures, are signs of early cultivation. This evidence of habitation, and the presence of huts associated with transhumance at high altitudes, demonstrate that local people are likely to have visited most if not all of the summits of the Ben Lawers range whilst grazing animals at height during the summer. The mapmaker Timothy Pont visited the area 1590s, and writer Ian R. Mitchell considers that Pont's surveys show that he, or one of his associates, is likely to have climbed Ben Lawers, and should therefore be credited with earliest recorded ascent. Otherwise, the earliest recorded ascent was by members of a party organised by military surveyor William Roy: although it is not certain that Roy himself climbed the peak, his writings show that measurements were taken from the summit of Ben Lawers on 17 September 1776.

The cairn, which was topped with a massive block of white quartz is no longer there; in any case the Ordnance Survey ignored it as an artificial structure that was not truly part of the hill.

Ownership
Prior to the 14th century, the mountain stood on the lands of Clan MacMillan. Chalmers of Lawers obtained the land by force from the clan in the mid 14th century in the reign of David II. The land was confiscated from the Chalmers family in 1473 by James III and given to Sir Colin Campbell of Glenorchy after Thomas Chalmers was implicated in the murder of James I. The lands have mainly remained in the ownership of the Campbells of Glenorchy and Breadalbane right up to the present day, with some notable exceptions. Many of the farms were sold off in the late 1940s.

Most of the south side of the Ben Lawers range has since 1950 been owned by the National Trust for Scotland, and was purchased through the generosity of Percy Unna, a mountaineer and one time president of the Scottish Mountaineering Club. The area of land under trust ownership was extended in 1996 by the purchase of the neighbouring Tarmachan range. The trust built a visitor centre located at the western end of the range that had an exhibition that explained the geological formation of the mountain, but this was closed and demolished in 2010. A new car park has been built on the opposite side of the road, from where a path leads to the summit of Ben Lawers by way of the intermediate peak of Beinn Ghlas. There is a nature trail on the lower section of this path, with information leaflets available in the car park.

The northern side of the Ben Lawers range comprises three privately owned estates, at Roroyere, Roromore, and South Chesthill. All three cover land extending from Glen Lyon to the watershead of the ridge. As with all land in Scotland, there is a freedom to roam on the hills regardless of whether the land is in public or private ownership, provided that access is exercised responsibly, in accordance with the Scottish Outdoor Access Code.

Nature and conservation

Ben Lawers is regarded by botanists as one of the richest areas for alpine flora in the UK, due to the schist rocks of the mountain which are situated at the correct altitude for the plants. The rocks supply an adequate amount of calcium, magnesium, sodium, potassium and iron to the plants and breaks down to a clayish soil which retains moisture. Some of the plants found on Lawers include alpine forget-me-not, roseroot, net-leaved willow and most of the saxifrages. The Sunday Times reported on February 15, 2021, that efforts are being made on Lawers to save the rare flower Sabulina rubella, also known as Mountain Sandwort, from extinction.

The mountain is also of interest to zoologists. Some of the bird species include ravens, ring ouzels, red grouse, ptarmigan, golden eagle, peregrine falcon, dotterel, golden plover, and short-eared owls. Other rare species include the viviparous lizard and the wildcat.

The Ben Lawers range has been designated as a National Nature Reserve (NNR) since 1964. In 2005 the boundary was altered so that all NTS land at Ben Lawers (including the neighbouring Tarmachan range) was included in the NNR, which the Trust now manages on behalf of NatureScot. Ben Lawers is also designated as a Special Area of Conservation (SAC), and a Site of Special Scientific Interest (SSSI). The Ben Lawers National Nature Reserve is classified as a Category II protected area by the International Union for Conservation of Nature.

The Ben Lawers range forms part of the Loch Rannoch and Glen Lyon National Scenic Area, one of 40 such areas in Scotland, which are defined so as to identify areas of exceptional scenery and to ensure its protection from inappropriate development by restricting certain forms of development.

Climbing
Ben Lawers is a popular mountain, resulting in path erosion and vegetation loss from the number of visiting hillwalkers. Since the 1980s NTS, in partnership with other groups, have undertaken work on the path network in an attempt to control the impact of the high visitor numbers. The simplest route of ascent starts from the NTS carpark, following a path that reaches the summit via an intermediate peak, Beinn Ghlas. Alternative routes that avoid the erosion caused by the popularity of the main route usually start by following Lawers Burn, which meet the A827 at the village of Lawers. Heading north from this burn allows the walker to climb the peaks to the northeast of Ben Lawers on the way. The most direct route to the summit of Ben Lawers from Lawers is to continue along the Lawers Burn as far as the Lochan nan Cat ("lochan of the cats"), before heading straight to the summit by way of the east ridge.

Gallery of images

See also
 Ben Nevis
 List of Munro mountains
List of places in Perth and Kinross
 Mountains and hills of Scotland

References

Ben Lawers, National Trust for Scotland,

External links

 Computer generated summit panoramas North South Index
NTS Ben Lawers page
Ben Lawers on Walk Highlands

Munros
Marilyns of Scotland
Mountains and hills of the Southern Highlands
National Trust for Scotland properties
National nature reserves in Scotland
Mountains and hills of Perth and Kinross
Sites of Special Scientific Interest in West Perth
Protected areas of Perth and Kinross
Highest points of historic Scottish counties
One-thousanders of Scotland